Beach Haven or Beachhaven may refer to:

New Zealand
Beach Haven, New Zealand

United States of America
Beach Haven, New Jersey
Beach Haven, Pennsylvania
Beach Haven West, New Jersey
North Beach Haven, New Jersey